Nervous Records is an American record label specializing in underground house and hip hop, founded in 1991. 

As of February 2022, Nervous is releasing several house and techno tracks on a weekly basis. The label also is involved in producing nightclub events at many prominent venues around New York, including The Brooklyn Mirage, Superior Ingredients, and The Brooklyn Monarch. DJ Magazine states that the label's cartoon character logo is an iconic record label logo in the music industry.

Mike Weiss is co-founder, along with his father, Sam Weiss. Sam Weiss was also the founder and president of the Disco Era imprint, Sam Records. Mike Weiss graduated from Stanford University in 1983 with a BA, Syracuse University Law School in 1986 with a JD, and the Newhouse School of Communications in 1986 with an MFA in Film. 

Nervous has released music from many of the legendary producers in dance music, including Masters At Work, Armand Van Helden, Todd Terry, Frankie Knuckles, Kerri Chandler and David Morales. Nervous also released three albums that are considered some of the most essential releases in the hip hop genre, including "Enta Da Stage" by Black Moon, "Dah Shinin' by Smif-N-Wessun, and "Real Ting" by Mad Lion.

See also
 List of record labels

References

External links
 Nervous Records NYC
 Discogs
 Label Focus: Nervous Records

American record labels
Record labels established in 1991
House music record labels
Hip hop record labels
1991 establishments in New York City